Oakley is a neighborhood in Cincinnati, Ohio, United States, that borders Pleasant Ridge, Madisonville, and Hyde Park. Oakley's business district, called Oakley Square, lies along Madison Road. Oakley is a primary thoroughfare and a major crosstown artery in Cincinnati.

In addition to Oakley Square, Oakley contains two shopping centers. Hyde Park Plaza on the south edge is named for the neighborhood to the south and is located at the intersection of two smaller neighborhood streets, Paxton Ave, which connects Oakley to Hyde Park and Mt Lookout, and Wasson Rd, which runs along the former Cincinnati and Eastern Railway line and connects Hyde Park Plaza to the larger Rookwood shopping centers in Norwood. The Center of Cincinnati on the north edge is part of continuing development on the south side of the I-71/Norwood Lateral/Ridge Rd interchange. Both of these centers are urban infill and car oriented, located on the edge of Oakley and designed to serve multiple neighborhoods. Oakley Square, by contrast, is located in the center of Oakley along several bus routes, making it more pedestrian and transit oriented.

Demographics

History

Oakley was originally known as "Four Mile," and was a popular stop in the mid-19th century for wagon drivers on the Madison Turnpike, now Madison Road. The village of Oakley, a name referring to the many oak trees in the area, was officially registered with the Hamilton County Courthouse in 1869 and the village was incorporated in 1898.  Oakley was once the home of the famed markswoman Annie Oakley, who made her public debut in 1876.

During the 1890s the community began to grow and the Oakley Race Course, famous for thoroughbred racing, was opened. The race track closed a few years later due to a state law prohibiting betting. The Cincinnati Milling Machine Company, often referred to as “the mill,” moved to Oakley in 1905 and library service began in 1910, when a deposit station opened in Barton's Drug Store.
 
Oakley was annexed to the city of Cincinnati in 1913. In the same year, Aglamesis Bro's Ice Cream Parlor and Candy Shoppe opened to accommodate the growing population of workers at the Mill, as the Cincinnati Milling Machine Company was called.

The Geier Esplanade, commonly known as Oakley Square, was created when two parcels of land were acquired in 1927 and 1932 and were converted into green space. It is situated in the heart of Oakley on Madison Road and, through the generosity of the Geier family, flowers and bulbs are planted each year to beautify this small parcel of land in memory of Mr. Fred Geier and Mr. Philip O. Geier, Sr.

The Twentieth Century Theatre was built in 1941 and is a distinctive Oakley landmark with its 72-foot tower rising over the business district. The deteriorating theater was slated for demolition in the early 1990s, but was spared due to its historical significance and is finding a new life as a concert and special events venue.

Oakley After Hours
Formerly known as "Final Fridays", Oakley After Hours is a monthly street festival held from 6-10PM on the second Friday of each month May through October. Oakley stores and restaurants keep their doors open for extended hours and offer sales, dining and drink specials, live music, and fun in the neighborhood. The event is sponsored each year by local businesses and is coordinated with the support of the Oakley Community Council.

References

External links

Oakley Community Council

Neighborhoods in Cincinnati
Former municipalities in Ohio